David Bowie Is was a touring museum exhibit displaying history, artifacts and information about the life, music, films, tours, and art of English singer-songwriter and actor David Bowie.

The show opened in March 2013 at the Victoria and Albert Museum in London and ended in July 2018 at the Brooklyn Museum in New York City. Over its 5-year run, it stopped at 12 museums around the world and attracted over 2 million visitors.

At each museum, the exhibit displayed about 500 objects; often a few hundred were unique to that particular museum.

An accompanying documentary film, also titled David Bowie Is, was directed by Hamish Hamilton, Katy Mullan, and Hanif Kureishi.

After the exhibit closed in July 2018, it was announced that in early 2019 a new, virtual version of the exhibit would be released on virtual and augmented reality platforms.

History 

Near the end of 2010, an archivist for Bowie's collection contacted the Victoria and Albert Museum (V&A) and asked if they'd be interested in a display. Bowie had saved most of the artifacts, costumes, and props from his career and had almost 75,000 pieces in a private collection.

Bowie allowed Victoria Broackes and Geoffrey Marsh, the V&A museum curators, free access to his archives for the show, although he did not get involved with how the pieces were displayed, nor the narrative of the show itself. Broackes and Marsh said that Bowie was "at the top of a very short list of people the V&A would cover as a single artist," and that Bowie "had one of the most, if not the most, complete archive of any pop music artist" they had ever seen. Broackes said that they got everything they asked for to display, except for items that had gone missing, such as Bowie's dress worn for the cover of his album The Man Who Sold the World.

According to museum directors at the Brooklyn Museum, "David Bowie asked that the exhibit open in London and close here [in New York]". The V&A Museum worked with 59 Productions and Real Studios to design the exhibit.

When the show was first booked at the V&A Museum, it was not generally felt that the exhibit would be very successful. However, it became the museum's fastest selling show with over 300,000 visitors. The success of the show at the V&A museum resulted in the decision to take the exhibit on tour, and it has sold roughly two million tickets across 11 cities around the world as of March 2018. As of 2018, the "David Bowie Is" exhibition holds the record for being the most visited exhibit in the V&A Museum's history.

When Bowie died in early 2016, the museum tour was almost canceled, with concerns for if and how the show would go on. There were also discussions as to whether to keep the name in the present tense (David Bowie Is). The exhibit, which was at the Groninger Museum in the Netherlands at the time, instead extended the show for 4 weeks to allow grieving fans to attend.

Exhibit contents 
A typical stop of the exhibit included around 500 objects, including over 60 performance costumes, handwritten lyrics, and Bowie's own oil paintings. The exhibition was organized thematically rather than chronologically. It included outfits designed by Alexander McQueen, Hedi Slimane, Issey Miyake, Vivienne Westwood and Kansai Yamamoto. There were over 50 video pieces, including television performances, music videos and concert footage. Music journalist Dan Hyman wrote in Rolling Stone of the Chicago exhibition that the retrospective taught him five things about Bowie; Namely that Bowie was "a fantastic painter and illustrator", "an avid collector of minutiae", "a style icon", "a tech geek at heart", and "an unflinching self-editor".

Some museums included items unique to their country or city, reflecting Bowie's connection to the area. For example, in New York, where Bowie lived, Brooklyn Museum's Matthew Yokobosky said "We have the original backdrop from when he performed in "The Elephant Man" on Broadway, and moments from when he worked on Julian Schnabel’s film Basquiat, on the life of New York artist Jean-Michel Basquiat. … While most of the Young Americans album was recorded in Philadelphia, "Fame" was actually recorded in New York City. That's how John Lennon just happened to stop by the studio that day. He [Lennon] actually did a drawing for David in the studio and I have that drawing in the show." Yokobosky also spoke about how and why they got the letters "BOWIE" for the exhibit: “The first time I met with Bowie’s archivist at the archive, I looked down one of the aisles and saw a photograph of the letter W resting on a case. I asked what it was, and the archivist told me that it corresponded to one of the letters from Bowie’s New York marathon tour in 2002, when he played five theaters in five boroughs of the city in five days—and every night they moved these brilliant letters which spelled out his name in light bulbs. Well, I saw that tour in the Beacon Theater, and I just blurted out, ‘I want the letters.’ They hadn't been seen since that tour, and we spent two months trying to figure out how to get them to work again."

While in Berlin at the Martin-Gropius-Bau museum, the exhibition added pieces from Bowie's time in West Berlin, his collaborations with Iggy Pop, and his Berlin Trilogy: Low (1977), "Heroes" (1977), and Lodger (1979).

When David Bowie Is opened in Tokyo, pieces from Japanese collaborator Kansai Yamamoto were highlighted, having designed costumes during Bowie's Ziggy Stardust (1972) and Aladdin Sane (1973) periods.

Scottish artist Paul Robertson contributed "The Periodic Table of Bowie" to the exhibition, a faux-periodic table of artists that have influenced, or were influenced by, Bowie over his career.

The final stop of David Bowie Is at the Brooklyn Museum (2 March to 15 July 2018) saw the release of the album Live In Berlin (1978), as well as a 7″ single containing the US single edit of 'Time'/'The Prettiest Star'. There was also the red vinyl version of iSelect, a 12 song compilation, which had first been made available in this format at the Paris exhibition. Live In Berlin was recorded on 16 May 1978 at the Deutschlandhalle in West Berlin during Bowie’s Isolar II Tour.

Technology 
The V&A Museum worked with audio company Sennheiser to create a custom audio experience for the exhibit. Originally the curators were nervous to ask visitors to wear headphones, fearing it would isolate them. As visitors walked around the exhibit, the audio changed as they entered "spheres" of Bowie's work, relating to particular events, people or cities that the artist has worked in. The headphones required no interaction; the music and information you hear simply changed as you approached different parts of the exhibit. Producer Tony Visconti, who worked with Bowie for many years, created a unique megamix from the master tapes of more than 60 Bowie songs for the exhibition.

Part of the exhibition included a cavernous room with large video screens displaying various Bowie live performances throughout the years and featuring surround sound, in which visitors were asked to remove their headphones.

Augmented reality app 
Announced in 2018, the augmented reality application was released on iOS and android devices on 8 January 2019, coinciding with Bowie's birthday. Bowie's friend, actor Gary Oldman, provides the voice-over for the application, which allows users virtual access to the costumes, videos, handwritten lyrics, and original works of art as seen in the museum show. The application also includes access to "dozens" of items that were not part of the original exhibition.

Dates of museum shows

See also 
David Bowie's art collection

References

External links 
V&A Museum page on the "David Bowie Is" collection
 

David Bowie
Museum events
Traveling exhibits
Victoria and Albert Museum
Brooklyn Museum
2013 introductions